The Wireless Set No. 38 was a HF portable man-pack radio transceiver used by the British Army during World War II. Designed by Murphy Radio, it was a 5 valve set covering 7.4 to 9 MHz and powered by a large dry cell battery carried in a separate haversack. An AFV variant was also developed for use alongside the Wireless Set No. 19 in armoured vehicles to allow direct communication between tank commanders and infantry. In 1945, a Mk. III version was produced housed in a sealed diecast metal enclosure.

References

External links
 http://www.vmarsmanuals.co.uk/archive/3706_WS38_Training_Notes.pdf

World War II British electronics
British military radio